Al-e Tayyeb (also Romanized as Āl-e Ţayyeb; also known as ‘Alī Tayāb, ‘Alī Ţayebī, and ‘Alī Tīāb) is a village in Dodangeh Rural District, in the Central District of Behbahan County, Khuzestan Province, Iran. At the 2006 census, its population was 516, in 96 families.

References 

Populated places in Behbahan County